
Gmina Narew is a rural gmina (administrative district) in Hajnówka County, Podlaskie Voivodeship, in north-eastern Poland.

Villages
Gmina Narew contains the villages and settlements of Ancuty, Białki, Bruszkowszczyzna, Chrabostówka, Cimochy, Cisy, Doratynka, Gorędy, Gorodczyno, Gorodzisko, Gradoczno, Hajdukowszczyzna, Istok, Iwanki, Janowo, Kaczały, Kotłówka, Koweła, Koźliki, Krzywiec, Kutowa, Lachy, Łapuchówka, Łosinka, Makówka, Narew, Nowinnik, Odrynki, Ogrodniki, Paszkowszczyzna, Podborowiska, Przybudki, Puchły, Radzki, Rohozy, Rybaki, Saki, Skaryszewo, Soce, Tokarowszczyzna, Trześcianka, Tyniewicze Duże, Tyniewicze Małe, Usnarszczyzna, Waniewo, Waśki and Zabłocie.

Neighbouring gminas
Gmina Narew is bordered by the gminas of Białowieża, Bielsk Podlaski, Czyże, Hajnówka, Michałowo, Narewka and Zabłudów.

References
 Polish official population figures 2006

Narew
Hajnówka County